The post of Lord Lieutenant of the North Riding of Yorkshire was created in 1660, at the Restoration, and was abolished on 31 March 1974. From 1782 until 1974, all Lords Lieutenant were also Custos Rotulorum of the North Riding of Yorkshire.

Lord Lieutenants of the North Riding of Yorkshire to 1974
Thomas Belasyse, 2nd Viscount Fauconberg 27 July 1660 – 19 November 1687
Charles Fairfax, 5th Viscount Fairfax of Emley 19 November 1687 – 5 October 1688
Henry Cavendish, 2nd Duke of Newcastle-upon-Tyne 5 October 1688 – 28 March 1689
Thomas Belasyse, 1st Earl Fauconberg 28 March 1689 – 4 April 1692
Thomas Osborne, 1st Duke of Leeds 4 April 1692 – 23 September 1699
Arthur Ingram, 3rd Viscount of Irvine 23 September 1699 – 21 June 1702
John Sheffield, 1st Duke of Buckingham and Normanby 11 June 1702 – 16 April 1705
John Holles, 1st Duke of Newcastle-upon-Tyne 16 April 1705 – 15 July 1711
John Sheffield, 1st Duke of Buckingham and Normanby 19 September 1711 – 27 December 1714
Robert Darcy, 3rd Earl of Holderness 27 December 1714 – 20 January 1721
Sir Conyers Darcy 7 March 1722  – 31 May 1740
Robert Darcy, 4th Earl of Holderness 31 May 1740 – 6 February 1778
Henry Belasyse, 2nd Earl Fauconberg 6 February 1778 – 23 March 1802
George Osborne, 6th Duke of Leeds 10 April 1802 – 10 July 1838
Thomas Dundas, 2nd Earl of Zetland 28 July 1838 – 6 May 1873
George Robinson, 1st Marquess of Ripon 21 March 1873 – 4 May 1906
Sir Hugh Bell, 2nd Baronet 4 May 1906 – 29 June 1931
The Honourable Geoffrey Howard 21 September 1931 – 20 June 1935
William Orde-Powlett, 5th Baron Bolton 19 July 1935 – 11 December 1944
Lawrence Dundas, 2nd Marquess of Zetland 28 February 1945 – 12 June 1951
Sir William Worsley, 4th Baronet 12 June 1951 – 15 June 1965
Oswald Phipps, 4th Marquess of Normanby 15 June 1965 – 31 March 1974†

†Became Lord Lieutenant of North Yorkshire.

Deputy lieutenants
A deputy lieutenant of the North Riding of Yorkshire was commissioned by the Lord Lieutenant of the North Riding of Yorkshire. Deputy lieutenants support the work of the lord-lieutenant. There can be several deputy lieutenants at any time, depending on the population of the county. Their appointment does not terminate with the changing of the lord-lieutenant, but they usually retire at age 75.

19th century
August 1852: Christopher Cradock, Esq.

References

Yorkshire, North Riding of
 
1660 establishments in England
1974 disestablishments in England